Michalovice may refer to:
 Michalovice (Havlíčkův Brod District), in Vysočina Region, Czech Republic
 Michalovice (Litoměřice District), in Ústí nad Labem Region, Czech Republic
 Michalovice Castle, near Mladá Boleslav, Central Bohemia, Czech Republic

See also 
 Michalovce, Slovakia
 Michalovce District, Slovakia
 Michałowice (disambiguation)